Imaginisterna (Swedish for the Imaginists) was a group of Swedish painters formed 1945 and dissolved 1955. Seeking an alternative approach to surrealism they turned away from the detailed style of Salvador Dalí and looked for inspiration from artist such as Max Ernst, Paul Klee and abstract expressionism.

Notable members
Max Walter Svanberg
Carl-Otto Hultén
Anders Österlin
Gösta Kriland

References
 Bra Böckers Lexikon, Band 11 (1986)
 Bra Böckers Lexikon, Band 22 (1981)

Swedish artist groups and collectives